Saint-André-le-Bouchoux is a commune in the Ain department in eastern France.

The river Irance flows through the town.

In 1836, the community was considered one of the poorest in France. It has gained wealth since, though. Today, most of the town revolves around restaurants, farms, and crafts.

Population

Sights
The church was designed in the Roman style in the 11th century and redesigned in the 15th.

See also
Communes of the Ain department
Dombes

References

External links

Dombes and the city of Saint Andre le Bouchoux
Official Web site 

Communes of Ain
Ain communes articles needing translation from French Wikipedia
Dombes